Ithome tiaynai is a moth in the family Cosmopterigidae. It is found in northern Chile.

The wingspan is about 9 mm.

The larvae feed on Acacia macracantha.

References

Moths described in 2004
Chrysopeleiinae
Endemic fauna of Chile